Kenneth William George Farmer (25 July 1910 – 5 March 1982) was an Australian rules footballer who played for the North Adelaide Football Club in the South Australian National Football League (SANFL). 
Dubbed the 'Bradman of football' in South Australia (contemporary  footballer George Doig was given the same nickname in Western Australia), Farmer is the most prolific full-forward across the major recognised leagues of Australian rules football. He is one of only two SANFL players to have scored over 1,000 career goals (the other being 's Tim Evans) and also coached  to two premierships.

Early life
Farmer was the eldest of two sons born to William Thomas Farmer, a labourer, and Ethel Ann (née Sitters). His younger brother, Elliott Maxwell, was born on 16 December 1911. Farmer was born and raised in North Adelaide and attended North Adelaide Public School, where he played Australian rules football on Fridays, and soccer on Saturdays. His early prowess in the round ball code resulted in being selected in the State Schoolboys soccer team.

Farmer left school at 14, as was common at the time, to work as  a junior storeman with Swallow & Ariell Ltd. He did not play football again until 1927, when he played with North Adelaide Ramblers Seconds and the Marryatville amateur team. In 1928 he was invited to play with the North Adelaide juniors, where he demonstrated some talent at marking and goalkicking, winning the best and fairest award.

Playing career
In 1929, the 18-year-old Farmer debuted in the North Adelaide League side. Playing at full-forward in his first season, he kicked an impressive 62 goals in only 14 games. 

The following season was a special one marred by tragedy. Shortly after becoming the first SANFL player to kick 100 goals in a season, Farmer suffered the shock loss of his brother Elliott on 5 September when, on the way home, their motorcycle collided head-on with a truck on Frome Road. Both brothers were thrown from the vehicle, with Elliott suffering severe head injuries while Ken sustained a sprained ankle. Elliott was taken to Adelaide Hospital but died shortly after admission, while Ken was able to return home after treatment. The shock of losing his younger brother, with whom Farmer was very close, and who was well known at the football club due to taking Ken to and from football training, was enough for Farmer to announce that he would not play football again that season. News of the incident also reached Melbourne, where it was published in the Sporting Globe. In later years, Farmer was said to suffer long periods of depression, most likely as a result of this accident. 

He played in the winning 1930 Grand Final side despite the great personal distress of his brother Elliot's death weeks earlier from a motorcycle crash that also involved Ken. In 1931 he kicked his 125th goal to break Gordon Coventry's VFL and elite football record of 124 in the Grand Final, which North Adelaide won.

Farmer captained North for five seasons (1934–1935, 1937–1938, 1941) and was club best and fairest in 1936. Despite his imposing record, his best performance in the Magarey Medal count was only fourth.

Farmer's great goal scoring came from many attributes. His goals came readily, from superb concentration and the ability to read the play and be in position. Not only was he a brilliant fast lead, but Farmer was described as having a very powerful grip and hence a strong mark. He was unnervingly accurate shooting for goals with the screw and flat punts (drop punts not being part of the game at that time).

Farmer's goalscoring prowess was also evident when representing South Australia in interstate matches, where he averaged five goals per game. His performances, especially against Victoria, attracted the attention of several Melbourne-based clubs who made offers for his signature, but he never accepted. 

Farmer's playing career ended during World War II when he went into the RAAF, where he served as a sergeant from April 1942 to July 1946.

Coaching career
Although Farmer's reputation as a legend of Australian rules football rests on his playing achievements, his success as a coach is often underrated. In his four seasons as coach, North Adelaide made it to the Grand final on three occasions for two victories. As someone who was years ahead of his peers in his understanding of Australian rules football during his playing days, Farmer was also considered well ahead of his time as a coach, in terms of his attention to detail and ability to prepare his teams both physically and mentally.

Farmer returned to North Adelaide after the war and was appointed coach of the Reserves side in 1948. He took over as senior coach from Haydn Bunton, Sr. for the 1949 SANFL season and took the Roosters to the minor premiership before guiding them to their seventh SANFL flag. He was reappointed coach for the following season, in which the club finished fifth. 

After losing to Port Adelaide in the 1951 SANFL Grand Final, Farmer decided to retire, but upon being inundated with requests to continue, informed the club he would coach for one more season.

In the lead-up to the 1952 SANFL season, while waiting for official clearance to resume coaching duties, Farmer shared with the Adelaide press that he believed the two main positional weaknesses that had prevented North Adelaide from winning the premiership in 1951 was in the roving and goalkicking department, and he had identified some country footballers to try out for the positions.

Record
In South Australia Farmer was known as "The Bradman of Goal kickers", a reference to the contemporary prolific cricket run scorer Donald Bradman. Farmer's goal kicking was certainly prolific.

Farmer's SANFL goal kicking record:

1929 – 62
1930 – 105
1931 – 126
1932 – 102
1933 – 112
1934 – 106
1935 – 128
1936 – 134
1937 – 108
1938 – 112
1939 – 113
1940 – 123
1941 – 86

In 13 seasons and 224 games for North Adelaide, Farmer kicked 1417 goals, making him the highest goal scorer in the history of the SANFL and elite Australian rules football, records that stand to this day. His average of 6.33 goals per game exceeds that of even VFL legends such as John Coleman, Peter McKenna, Gordon Coventry and Tony Lockett (VFL/AFL record 1360 goals), and WAFL legend Bernie Naylor.

On 35 occasions he kicked 10 goals or more, and he was held goalless only once, when he was carried off injured after 10 minutes of play. His highest in a year was 134, but rather than kicking more in a season, he kicked 100 goals 11 times: his 1936 tally was a record until 1969, when it was broken by Fred Phillis of Glenelg.

Ken Farmer also played 17 representative games for South Australia and kicked 81 goals; if these matches and the Tasmanian competitions are considered, this total of 1,498 goals placed him second behind Peter Hudson as the highest goal-scorer in elite Australian rules football history (Hudson's career total was 1,721 in premiership matches and 2,191 overall).

He holds the equal record for most goals kicked in a SANFL or elite match with 23.6 against West Torrens, out of his side's score of 26.11.

Highest tally against other SANFL Clubs:
 West Torrens 23
 South Adelaide 16
 Glenelg 15
 Norwood 13
 West Adelaide 13
 Sturt 13
 Port Adelaide 12

Outside Football
Farmer married Floris Edna Craig, a shop assistant, on 21 December 1935 at St Cuthbert's Anglican Church in Prospect. They had one son, Milton, born in 1941. Farmer saw his son for the first time after returning from war service.
Outside of football, Farmer worked as a sales representative, chiefly for G. & R. Wills & Co. Ltd, before retiring in 1970. 
He died on 5 March 1982 at Modbury and was cremated. He was survived by his wife, son and grandchildren.

Honours

Farmer was made a Life Member of the North Adelaide Football Club in 1937. In 1980 the "Ken Farmer Gates" were dedicated on the eastern side of North Adelaide's home ground, Prospect Oval. Since 1981, the leading goalkicker in the SANFL each season has been awarded the "Ken Farmer Medal".

Farmer has been named as an icon of the North Adelaide Football Club. In 2012, the club named the northern end of the Prospect Oval the "Ken Farmer End". In 2000 Farmer was selected as full forward in North Adelaide's official 'Team of the Twentieth Century'.

Farmer was inducted into the Australian Football Hall of Fame in 1998, and was an inaugural inductee to the SANFL Hall of Fame in 2002.

References

Bibliography
 
 North Adelaide Football Club,"Icons of the Club" Retrieved 16 October 2006

External links

 
 

Australian Football Hall of Fame inductees
North Adelaide Football Club players
North Adelaide Football Club coaches
Australian rules footballers from Adelaide
South Australian Football Hall of Fame inductees
1910 births
1982 deaths
Royal Australian Air Force personnel of World War II
Royal Australian Air Force airmen
Military personnel from South Australia